Ikea Trading und Design AG v BOE Bank Ltd, an important case in South African property law, was heard in the Supreme Court of Appeal on March 18, 2004, with judgment handed down on April 1.

Facts 
The first respondent was the holder of a general covering notarial bond, passed in its favour by W CC over the assets of the latter. When W CC was placed in final liquidation, the first respondent applied to the High Court for an order declaring that the liquidation and distribution account in respect of W CC had to be redrawn so as to reflect its preference by virtue of that bond. The argument was raised that the bond did not comply with the requirements of the Security by Means of Movable Property Act, because it failed to specify and describe the assets referred to in the bond in a manner which rendered the assets readily recognisable.

Issue 
The central issue in the instant appeal was whether or not a bond registered under the Act. complied with the requirements so that the "mortgagee" acquired security in the movable property referred to in the bond and therefore ranked as a secured creditor in the event of the liquidation of the debtor.

Judgment 
It was clear to the court that, without reference to invoices and other documents in respect of the items listed, or without the intervention of some person who was able to say that the particular items listed were subject to the bond, the items could not be identified as those listed in the bond. The court held that the bond had to specify and describe the property so as to render it readily recognisable. Nothing could be added to an instrument that had the effect of creating a real right that availed against third parties. The third party had to be able to identify the items by reference to the document alone, by correlating the descriptions contained therein with property fitting such descriptions.

The court held further that, in the instant case, the items enumerated in the bond had not been specified and described in the manner required by the Act. It was not possible for third parties, even the liquidators, to take the bond and to correlate the descriptions with the assets on the premises. In the circumstances, the bond had failed to create a deemed pledge over the property of W CC, with the result that the appellant was not a secured creditor.

The appeal was thus dismissed, and the decision in the Eastern Cape Division of the High Court, in BOE Bank Ltd v Ikea Trading und Design AG, confirmed.

See also 
 South African property law
2004 in South Africa

References

Cases 
 Ikea Trading und Design AG v BOE Bank Ltd 2005 (2) SA 7 (SCA).

Statutes 
Security by Means of Movable Property Act 57 of 1993.

Notes 

2004 in South African law
2004 in case law
South African property case law
Supreme Court of Appeal of South Africa cases
IKEA